Lötschberg is an Alpine mountain massif in Switzerland.

Lötschberg may also refer to:

 Lötsche Pass, an Alpine mountain pass over the Lötschberg
 Lötschberg railway line, a railway line which underpasses the mountain
 Lötschberg Tunnel, a 14.6km tunnel opened in 1913
 Lötschberg Base Tunnel, a 34.6km tunnel opened in 2007
 , a 1914 paddle steamer which operates on Lake Brienz, Switzerland

See also
 Bern-Lötschberg-Simplon Railway, builders of Lötschberg Tunnel, a predecessor of the Swiss railway company BLS AG